Three Hearts in the Happy Ending Machine is a 1986 solo album by Daryl Hall. The album features his only top-ten solo single, "Dreamtime", which peaked at number five on the Billboard Hot 100. The second single, "Foolish Pride", peaked at number 33.

Track listing

Singles
The album's lead single, "Dreamtime", reached No. 5 on the Billboard Hot 100 on October 4, 1986, and remained on the chart for 15 weeks. Receiving significant play on American radio stations across multiple formats, peaked at No. 3 on the Radio & Records CHR/Pop Airplay chart,  No. 24 on the Billboard Adult Contemporary chart, and number 11 on the Album Rock Tracks chart. A club play hit as well, the remix version peaked at No. 36 on the Billboard Hot Dance/Club Play chart on October 15, 1986. The song was ranked as the 53rd most successful song of 1986 across contemporary hit radio in the United States by Radio & Records.

The next single, "Foolish Pride", peaked at No. 33 on the Hot 100 on the December 6, 1986, remaining on the chart for 13 weeks. It peaked at No. 29 on the Radio & Records CHR/Pop Airplay chart and No. 21 on the Adult Contemporary chart. Crossing over to the R&B charts, the single reached number 91 on the Billboard Hot Black Singles chart on December 27, 1986. The single also reached No. 29 on the Cashbox Top 100.

The last single, "Someone Like You", went to No. 57 on the Hot 100 on February 21, 1987, during an eight-week chart run in early 1987. On the Adult Contemporary chart, it peaked at No. 11.

Critical reception

Stephen Thomas Erlewine of AllMusic commented that 3 Hearts is a record "tied to its time", and that "although he couldn't quite pull it together at the time, of interest as a portrait of where Hall was in 1986." Robert Christgau was far more critical, giving the record a C and stating that the album was "bloated by endless codas, superfluous instrumentation, hall upon hall of vocal mirrors, and the artist's unshakable confidence that his talent makes him significant."

Production 
 Produced by Daryl Hall, Dave Stewart and T-Bone Wolk; "What's Gonna Happen To Us" produced by Daryl Hall.
 Recorded between October 1985 and May 1986.
 Engineer at Studio de la Grande in Armee, Paris, France – Manu Guiot; assisted by Frederick Defaye and Serge Pauchard.
 Engineer at The Church in Crouch End, London, England – Jon Bavin; assisted by Stephen Gallifent.
 Engineer at Marcus Studios, London – Manu Guiot; assisted by Dick Beetham and Tim Burrell.
 Engineers at Right Track Studios, New York City – Frank Filipetti and Manu Guiot; assisted by Noah Baron and Paul Hamingson.
 Engineer at Electric Lady Studio, New York City – Manu Guiot; assisted by Ken Steiger.
 Mixed by Bob Clearmountain at Electric Lady Studio, except "For You": Mixed by Frank Filipetti at Electric Lady; Filipetti was assisted by Ken Steiger.
 Mastered by Bob Ludwig at Masterdisk (New York City, NY).
 Art Direction and Design – Jeb Brien and Joe Stelmach
 Hand Tinting – Cheryl Winser
 Photography – Paul Elledge

Personnel 
 Daryl Hall – lead and backing vocals, keyboards, guitars, mandolin, drum programming
 Robbie Kilgore – keyboards
 Mike Klvana – keyboards, Synclavier programming 
 Patrick Seymour – keyboards, E-mu Emulator II sampling
 Stephen Gillifant – E-mu Emulator II sampling
 Ric Morcombe – guitars
 G.E. Smith – guitars
 Jamie West-Oram – guitars
 David A. Stewart – guitars, guitar solo (1), drum programming
 Robbie McIntosh – guitars, guitar solo (4)
 Tom "T-Bone" Wolk – guitars, mandolin, bass guitar 
 Tony Beard – drums, additional percussion
 Michel De La Porte – percussion
 Steve Ferrone – additional percussion
 Olle Romo – additional percussion
 Jimmy Bralower – drum programming
 Manu Guiot – drum programming
 Steve Harvey  – drum programming
 Bob Riley – drum programming
 Lenny Pickett – saxophone
 Dick Morrissey – saxophone solo (3)
 Michael Kamen – string arrangements and conductor (1)
 June Montana – additional backing vocals (1)
 Kate St. John – additional backing vocals (1)
 Bob Geldof – additional backing vocals (2, 5)
 Joni Mitchell – additional backing vocals (8)

Charts

References

1986 albums
Daryl Hall albums
Albums produced by David A. Stewart
Albums recorded at Electric Lady Studios
RCA Records albums